Evelyn Maitland "Lyn" Wellings (6 April 1909 – 10 September 1992) was an Egyptian-born English cricketer and journalist, who played for Oxford University and Surrey.

Life and career
Lyn Wellings was born in Alexandria, Egypt, where his father was a tea merchant. He was sent to England for his education at the age of six, beginning at a prep school in Bournemouth and going on to Cheltenham College and Christ Church, Oxford, where he studied Classics. At Oxford, he won blues for cricket and golf.

He had his most successful cricket season in 1931, taking 52 wickets with his off-spin at an average of 27.57. At the start of the season he took his best first-class figures of 6 for 75 against Leicestershire, and in the final match he took seven wickets when Oxford beat Cambridge in the University Match at Lord's. 

After a brief period as a schoolmaster, Wellings became a trenchant cricket correspondent, usually with the by-line E. M. Wellings, writing for the Daily Mirror and the London Evening News, the latter between 1938 and 1973, with the exception of war service in the Honourable Artillery Company. He wrote the annual review of Public Schools cricket in Wisden from 1945 to 1972.

Ian Wooldridge said that Wellings "dipped his pen in vitriol". His Wisden obituary noted that he attacked one-day cricket, overseas players in county teams, faulty technique, the isolation of South African cricket, and anything to do with the Test and County Cricket Board, and that "the tone of his argument was so forceful that it usually upset more people than it won over". David Frith, however, defended Wellings, saying that "his attacks on the game's adverse trends and ill-conceived pieces of administration were the compulsion of a man whose regard for cricket was unusually deep", and came from someone who had himself played the game well and was "an outstanding analyst". Frith added, "Wellings gave every impression of enjoying his infamous reputation."

Books
No Ashes for England 1951
Meet the Australians 1953
The Ashes Retained 1955
The Ashes Thrown Away: The M.C.C. Tour of Australia 1958-59 1959
Dexter versus Benaud: M.C.C. Tour of Australia 1962-3 1963
Simpson's Australians: The England Tour 1964 1964
A History of County Cricket: Middlesex 1972
Vintage Cricketers 1983

References

External links

1909 births
1992 deaths
Surrey cricketers
Oxford University cricketers
Sportspeople from Alexandria
English male journalists
English cricketers
Marylebone Cricket Club cricketers
Egyptian emigrants to England
Egyptian cricketers
Egyptian people of English descent
People educated at Cheltenham College
Alumni of Christ Church, Oxford
H. D. G. Leveson Gower's XI cricketers
Honourable Artillery Company soldiers
Cricket historians and writers